John Eyre, 1st Baron Eyre ( – 30 September 1781), was an Irish politician.

Early life
Eyre was the son of the Very Reverend Giles Eyre, Dean of Killaloe, by Mary Cox, granddaughter of Sir Richard Cox, 1st Baronet, Lord Chancellor of Ireland. He was the grandson of John Eyre, Member of Parliament for Galway County, and the great-grandson of John Eyre, Mayor of Galway. His uncle John Eyre also represented Galway County in the Irish Parliament.

He was educated at Trinity College, Dublin.

Career
Eyre was returned to the Irish House of Commons for Galway Borough in 1748, a seat he held until 1768. The latter year he was raised to the Peerage of Ireland as Baron Eyre, of Eyrecourt in the County of Galway.

Personal life
In 1746, Lord Eyre married Eleanor Staunton, daughter of James Staunton. Together, they were the parents of:

 Hon. Mary Eyre (d. 1775), who married Hon. Francis Caulfeild, MP, second son of James Caulfeild, 3rd Viscount Charlemont.
 John Eyre (1747–1747), who died in infancy.

He died in September 1781. Eyre had no surviving sons and the barony died with him.

Descendants
Through his daughter Mary, he was a grandfather of Eleanor Caulfeild, who married William Howard, 3rd Earl of Wicklow, the former MP for St Johnstown.

References

1781 deaths
Barons in the Peerage of Ireland
Peers of Ireland created by George III
Alumni of Trinity College Dublin
Year of birth uncertain
Irish MPs 1727–1760
Irish MPs 1761–1768
Members of the Parliament of Ireland (pre-1801) for County Galway constituencies
Politicians from County Galway
1720 births